Cameron Argetsinger (March 1, 1921 in Youngstown, Ohio, United States – April 22, 2008) was a sports car enthusiast, lawyer and auto racing executive best known for creating the Watkins Glen Grand Prix Race Course in Watkins Glen, New York, and making it the home of the Formula One United States Grand Prix from 1961 through 1980.

Biography

Early life
Argetsinger grew up in Youngstown, where his father, James Cameron Argetsinger, was general counsel and secretary of the Youngstown Sheet and Tube Company.  He spent the summers of his boyhood in Schuyler County, New York visiting his grandparents and, later, his family's summer home. He inherited a love of fast cars from his father and in 1947 bought a sports car so he could become a member of the nascent Sports Car Club of America.

Watkins Glen Sports Car Grand Prix
Before long, Argetsinger began to dream of organizing a sports car race in and around the town of Watkins Glen. "It's been said, and it's not entirely wrong, that I did it because I had an MG-TC and didn't have a place to race it," he told The New York Times in 1998. From 1948 through 1952, the Watkins Glen Sports Car Grand Prix was held on a circuit that followed public roads through the village and around the nearby gorge. While the event was hugely popular, the deaths of drivers and spectators in crashes forced it to move off the public roads after eight years.

Home of the United States Grand Prix
In 1953, Argetsinger was named Executive Director of the new Watkins Glen Grand Prix Corporation. Three years later, the group purchased  of land and built a 2.3-mile permanent racing facility, designed to imitate the winding country roads on which the race had originated. Soon the circuit was attracting some of the world's best road racers, including Stirling Moss, Jo Bonnier, Phil Hill and Dan Gurney, for the Formula Libre races, which ran from 1958 through 1960. These events set the stage for Argetsinger's bid to host the ultimate American road racing event: the Formula One United States Grand Prix. His timing was perfect: the United States Grand Prix saw disappointing crowds at in its first two runnings at Sebring, Florida, and Riverside, California. The race found a home in upstate New York in 1961, and Watkins Glen became the focal point of American road racing for the next two decades.

In 1969, Argetsinger attempted to purchase the raceway in order to improve its financial operations. When the Grand Prix Corporation refused to sell, he resigned as Executive Director and moved to Midland, Texas, where he went to work for Chaparral Cars.

Auto racing executive
Argetsinger moved to Denver in 1972 to become the Director of Professional Racing and then Executive Director of the Sports Car Club of America. In 1977, he returned to his law practice in Schuyler County, New York. He became president of the International Motor Racing Research Center in Watkins Glen in 2002.

Career Award
Argetsinger was a member of the inaugural induction class of the Sports Car Club of America Hall of Fame in 2005.

In 2005, Watkins Glen International renamed its trophy for the Indy Racing League race champion the "Cameron R. Argetsinger Trophy". Each year, the winner receives a sterling-silver replica and their name is added to the nameplate at the base of the sterling-silver cup.

Notes

First recipient of SCCA Woolf Barnato Trophy (1948)
Recipient of Bob Akin Memorial Award (2007) from the Road Racing Driver's Club (RRDC)

See also
 Formula Libre
 Formula One
 Sports Car Club of America
 United States Grand Prix
 Watkins Glen Grand Prix
 Watkins Glen International
 Watkins Glen, New York

References
 O'Malley, J.J. and Bill Green. Watkins Glen, From Griswold to Gordon: Fifty Years of Competition At the Home of American Road Racing. 1998.
 Siano, Joseph. "The Hallowed Ground Of Sports Car Racing." The New York Times. 4 Sept. 1998.
 Herzog, Brad. "Driving Force."
 Racing Archives.
NYTimes Obituary

External links
 Biography of Cameron Argetsinger
 History of Watkins Glen

Auto racing executives
Formula One people
Sports Car Club of America
1921 births
2008 deaths
American motorsport people
Businesspeople from Youngstown, Ohio
Cornell Law School alumni
People from Watkins Glen, New York
20th-century American businesspeople